Kingerby Castle was in the small settlement of Kingerby some five miles north-west of Market Rasen, Lincolnshire.

It was a motte and bailey castle which was burnt down in 1216 by King John of England, before being fully destroyed in December 1218. The motte was then altered to form a platform for a manor house which was built on the site.  In 1812 the manor house was demolished and replaced by Kingerby Hall, which still stands on the site.

See also
Castles in Great Britain and Ireland
List of castles in England
St Peter's Church, Kingerby

References

Castles in Lincolnshire
Buildings and structures demolished in the 13th century